Hanover Junction Railroad Station is a historic railroad station located at Hanover Junction in North Codorus Township, York County, Pennsylvania.  It was built between 1852 and 1854, and is a three-story, three bay by six bay rectangular frame building built by the Hanover Branch Railroad. It has a flat roof.  The station remained in service until the 1920s.

On November 18–19, 1863, President Abraham Lincoln traveled through Hanover Junction to and from dedication ceremonies for the Gettysburg National Cemetery.  A series of photographs were believed to depict Lincoln on the station platform. However, numerous historians have since debunked these suspicions.

It was added to the National Register of Historic Places in 1983.

The station now houses a museum with Civil War images, models of the various configurations of the building over the years, memorabilia, and other displays. It is also a restroom stop for the York County Heritage Rail Trail, a bicycle and walking path which parallels the old tracks of the Northern Central Railway.

References

External links

 Hanover Junction Museum - York County
 Heritage Rail Trail Park - York County
 Hanover Junction Railroad Station Stories about growing up in the Hanover Junction Railroad Station by Roger Shaffer

Railway stations on the National Register of Historic Places in Pennsylvania
Railway stations in the United States opened in 1854
Transportation buildings and structures in York County, Pennsylvania
Museums in York County, Pennsylvania
Railroad museums in Pennsylvania
National Register of Historic Places in York County, Pennsylvania
1854 establishments in Pennsylvania